Mastacembelus is a genus of many species of spiny eel fish from the family Mastacembelidae. They are native to Africa (c. 45 species) and Asia (c. 15 species). Most are found in rivers and associated systems (even in rapids), but there are also species in other freshwater habitats and a particularly rich radiation is found in the Lake Tanganyika basin with 15 species (14 endemic). A few species can even occur in brackish water.

Appearance

The size and pattern varies greatly depending on the exact species of Mastacembelus. M. erythrotaenia, often known as the fire eel, is blackish with an orange-red pattern, and it is a popular aquarium fish. Otherwise species in this genus are typically brownish and often have a spotted, speckled or mottled pattern, either in another brown hue, grayish or yellowish. This pattern is reflected in the common name of another species sometimes kept in aquariums, the zig-zag eel M. armatus (alternatively called the tire track eel, a name otherwise used for M. favus). A few others also occasionally appear in the aquarium trade, and some are considered good food fish and eaten locally. M aviceps, M. brichardi, M. crassus and M. latens are found in dark, deep parts of the Congo River and sometimes shallower among rocks. These four species have reduced eyes and are all pinkish-white in color (non-pigmented), similar to cavefish.

Taxonomy
In an evaluation of the Mastacembelidae in 2005, the genera Caecomastacembelus and Aethiomastacembelus (formerly used for the African species) were placed in synonymy with Mastacembelus.

Species

According to FishBase, there are currently 61 recognized species in this genus. 4 additional species (marked with a star* in the list) are recognized by Catalog of Fishes.

 Mastacembelus alboguttatus Boulenger, 1893
 Mastacembelus albomaculatus Poll, 1953
 Mastacembelus ansorgii Boulenger, 1905
 Mastacembelus apectoralis K. J. Brown, Britz, I. R. Bills, Rüber & J. J. Day, 2011
 Mastacembelus armatus (Lacépède, 1800) (Zig zag eel)
 Mastacembelus aviceps T. R. Roberts & D. J. Stewart, 1976
 Mastacembelus batesii* Boulenger, 1911
 Mastacembelus brachyrhinus Boulenger, 1899
 Mastacembelus brichardi Poll, (1958) (Blind spiny eel)
 Mastacembelus catchpolei Fowler, 1936
 Mastacembelus congicus Boulenger, 1896
 Mastacembelus crassus T. R. Roberts & D. J. Stewart, 1976
 Mastacembelus cryptacanthus Günther, 1867
 Mastacembelus cunningtoni Boulenger, 1906
 Mastacembelus dayi Boulenger, 1912 – junior synonym of M. alboguttatus according to Catalog of Fishes
 Mastacembelus decorsei Pellegrin, 1919
 Mastacembelus dienbienensis V. H. Nguyễn & H. D. Nguyễn, 2005 – belongs in genus Sinobdella according to Catalog of Fishes
 Mastacembelus ellipsifer Boulenger, 1899
 Mastacembelus erythrotaenia Bleeker, 1850 (Fire eel)
 Mastacembelus favus Hora, 1924 (Tire track eel)
 Mastacembelus flavidus Matthes, 1962
 Mastacembelus flavomarginatus* Boulenger, 1898
 Mastacembelus frenatus Boulenger, 1901 (Longtail spiny eel)
 Mastacembelus goro* Boulenger, 1902
 Mastacembelus greshoffi Boulenger, 1901
 Mastacembelus kakrimensis Vreven & Teugels, 2005
 Mastacembelus latens T. R. Roberts & D. J. Stewart, 1976
 Mastacembelus liberiensis Boulenger, 1898
 Mastacembelus loennbergii Boulenger, 1898
 Mastacembelus malabaricus* Jerdon, 1849
 Mastacembelus marchei Sauvage, 1879
 Mastacembelus mastacembelus (J. Banks & Solander, 1794)
 Mastacembelus micropectus Matthes, 1962
 Mastacembelus moorii Boulenger, 1898
 Mastacembelus niger Sauvage, 1879
 Mastacembelus nigromarginatus Boulenger, 1898
 Mastacembelus notophthalmus T. R. Roberts, 1989
 Mastacembelus oatesii Boulenger, 1893
 Mastacembelus ophidium Günther, 1894
 Mastacembelus pantherinus Britz, 2007
 Mastacembelus paucispinis Boulenger, 1899
 Mastacembelus plagiostomus Matthes, 1962
 Mastacembelus platysoma Poll & Matthes, 1962
 Mastacembelus polli Vreven, 2005
 Mastacembelus praensis (Travers, 1992)
 Mastacembelus reygeli Vreven & Snoeks, 2009
 Mastacembelus robertsi (Vreven & Teugels, 1996)
 Mastacembelus sanagali Thys van den Audenaerde, 1972
 Mastacembelus seiteri Thys van den Audenaerde, 1972
 Mastacembelus sexdecimspinus (T. R. Roberts & Travers, 1986)
 Mastacembelus shiloangoensis (Vreven, 2004)
 Mastacembelus shiranus Günther, 1896 (Malawi spiny eel)
 Mastacembelus simbi Vreven & Stiassny, 2009
 Mastacembelus strigiventus W. Zhou & L. P. Yang, 2011
 Mastacembelus taiaensis (Travers, 1992)
 Mastacembelus tanganicae Günther, 1894
 Mastacembelus thacbaensis V. H. Nguyễn & H. D. Nguyễn, 2005 – junior synonym of M. undulatus according to Catalog of Fishes
 Mastacembelus tinwini Britz, 2007
 Mastacembelus traversi (Vreven & Teugels, 1997)
 Mastacembelus triolobus W. Zhou & L. P. Yang, 2011
 Mastacembelus trispinosus Steindachner, 1911
 Mastacembelus undulatus (McClelland, 1844)
 Mastacembelus unicolor G. Cuvier, 1832
 Mastacembelus vanderwaali P. H. Skelton, 1976 (Ocellated spiny eel)
 Mastacembelus zebratus Matthes, 1962

References

 
Mastacembelidae
Taxa named by Giovanni Antonio Scopoli
Freshwater fish genera